The 1928 Ekstraklasa was contested by 15 teams, and Wisła Kraków won the championship.

League table

Results

Top goalscorers

References
Poland - List of final tables (RSSSF)

Ekstraklasa seasons
1
Pol
Pol